Abu Obaida (Arabic: أبو عبيدة, romanized: Abū ʿUbayda), also spelled Abu Obayda, Abu Ubayda and Abu Ubaydah, is the nom de guerre of a Palestinian militant who is the spokesman for the Izz ad-Din al-Qassam Brigades, the military wing of the Islamist Palestinian organization Hamas.

Personal details 
Abu Obaida's actual name is not known, and neither are most of his personal details. He only appears wearing a keffiyeh covering his face. In 2014, Israeli media outlets released a photo, allegedly of Abu Obaida, with the name Huzaifa Samir Abdullah al-Kahloot. However, the validity of the photo and name were denied by the al-Qassam Brigades, a senior leader of which said that Abu Obaida "does not and will not appear to the media," and that only a small number of people knew who he actually was.

Abu Obaida's first appearance was in 2006, when he announced the capture of Israeli soldier Gilad Shalit.

Statements 
In June 2020, in response to plans by Israeli leaders to officially annex parts of the West Bank, Abu Obaida said that "the forces of the resistance will faithfully protect the Palestinian people," and vowed to "make the enemy bite its fingers in regret for such a sinful decision." He described the Israeli plans as a "declaration of war."

During the 2021 escalation in the Palestinian-Israeli conflict, Abu Obaida said that striking Tel Aviv, Dimona, Ashdod, Ashkelon and Beersheba were "easier for us than drinking water," proclaiming that "there are no red lines when responding to the agression." After a ceasefire agreement was reached, he said, "With the help of God, we were able to humiliate the enemy, its fragile entity and its savage army."

In September 2021, after four out of the six Gilboa prison escapees were rearrested by Israeli forces, Abu Obaida announced that no future prisoner exchange with Israel would take place without freeing the escapees, saying that “if the heroes of the Freedom Tunnel have liberated themselves this time from underground, we promise them and our free prisoners that they will be liberated soon, God willing, from above ground.”

In May 2022, in response to Israeli calls to assassinate Hamas leader Yahya Sinwar following several Palestinian attacks on Israelis, Abu Obaida said that if "the enemy and its failing leadership" hurt Sinwar, it would unleash a "regional earthquake and an unprecedented response."

In June 2022, Abu Obaida announced that the medical condition of one of the Israeli captives in Gaza has deteriorated. The al-Qassam Brigades later released a video showing that the captive in question was Hisham al-Sayed.

References 

Hamas military members
Palestinian militants